Jan Ali (also Romanized as Jān ‘Alī and Jān‘alī) is a village in Agahan Rural District, Kolyai District, Sonqor County, Kermanshah Province, Iran. At the 2006 census, its population was 93, in 18 families.

References 

Populated places in Sonqor County